"La Javanaise" is a song written and composed by Serge Gainsbourg originally for Juliette Gréco, and interpreted by both her and Serge Gainsbourg in 1963. The first recordings of both artists constituted the B-sides of each of the two 45s.

Recording Information 
 By Serge Gainsbourg : 
 Recording Date : January 1963 at Studio Fontana (London)
 Arrangements and conducting : Harry Robinson
 Producer : Jacques Plait
 Format : 45 rpm EP Philips 432-862 (Title: "Vilaine fille mauvais garçon")
 Duration : 
 Release Date : March 1963 
 By Juliette Gréco : 
 Recording Date : 4 April 1963 at Studio Blanqui (Paris)
 Arrangements and conducting : Jean-Michel Defaye
 Format : 45 rpm S Philips 373-156 
 Duration : 
 Release Date : May 1963
 Publishers : Warner Chappel Music Publishing, Melody Nelson Publishing

Genesis
One summer evening in 1962, Gréco and Gainsbourg spent the evening listening to records and drinking champagne in the huge lounge at 33, rue de Verneuil. The next day, he sent her La Javanaise. [...] It seems that Gréco had debuted it in March 1963 by placing it at the beginning of her cabaret tour La Tête de l'art.
The title is a pun playing on the Parisian java dancing and the javanais style of speaking. The song heavily employs unaltered French words that naturally have an  sequence; thus the lyrics resemble the word game of javanais.

In films
 Bruno Podalydès used this song in the comedy Dieu seul me voit (Versailles-Chantiers) (1998).
 In Ron Howard's Da Vinci Code (2006), this song is played in the car of a French police officer.
 Pascale Ferran used this song in the film Bird People (2014).
 Madeleine Peyroux's 2006 recording was used in Guillermo del Toro's The Shape of Water (2017).

References

External links
 Serge Gainsbourg - La Javanaise (1968), Les archives de la RTS at YouTube.

1963 songs
Serge Gainsbourg songs
Songs written by Serge Gainsbourg
1963 singles
Philips Records singles
Songs about Indonesia